Euthecta cooksoni, the Cookson's buff, is a butterfly in the family Lycaenidae. It is found in Tanzania and Mozambique.

Euthecta cooksoni is a species of the coastal forests of East Africa, currently known from just five localities but three subspecies: from the Kitchi Hills Forest (up to 40 km inland) and the Rondo area of Tanzania, and from the southernmost coastal forests of Mozambique. This area is poorly collected and the species must be highly under reported. Nonetheless, the extent of occurrence is large and also stretches over several thousand kilometres of completely unexplored country between Rondo and Amatongas. Therefore, the species is best classified as being of least concern.

Subspecies
Euthecta cooksoni cooksoni (Mozambique)
Euthecta cooksoni marginata Henning & Henning, 2004 (Tanzania)
Euthecta cooksoni subgrisea Henning & Henning, 2004 (south-eastern Tanzania)

References

Butterflies described in 1954
Poritiinae